Woh Teri Bhabhi Hai Pagle (English: She is your sister-in-law, O Crazy!!!) is an Indian fiction sitcom television series, which premiered on 18 January 2016, and was broadcast on SAB TV. The series was produced by Optimystix Entertainment of Vipul D. Shah.

Krishna Gokani , Ali Asgar and Ather Habib played the lead roles. Krishna Gokani played the role of a doctor, while Ather Habib became a doctor and Ali Asgar became a patient with the help of Ashwin Kaushal. The two patient and doctor fall in love with the doctor.

Plot

This story is about a gangster, Nathu Nakabandi (Ali Asgar) and a son of a rich father, Ranbeer Raichand (Ather Habib). Both of them suddenly fall in love with Dr. Diya (Krishna Gokani), But she hates gangsters as well as the rich who buy degrees and join their sons in hospitals as doctors. Nathu forgets his all bad deeds to impress Dr. Diya as well as becoming a patient in the hospital, All Is Well (Dr Diya's Hospital), he does it with the help of one of his goons (Ashwin Kaushal). On the other hand, Ranbeer becomes a doctor impressing Diya by admitting Nathu into the hospital and fakes that he knows Nathu's sickness, but as he didn't have one, Nathu doubted him. Watching Nathu agreeing with him to every symptom of his sickness, Ranbeer doubted him, too. Yet doctor Diya was impressed by Ranbeerand told him that he could join the hospital, still telling her that he is poor and telling Nathu that he can stay in the hospital till he doesn't get any cure. The both of them later know each one's identity and knowing both of them loves Diya, they tried to get each one to tell their truth to Diya.

Cast
 Krishna Gokani as Dr. Diya
 Ali Asgar as Nathu Nakabandi
 Ather Habib as Dr. Ranbeer Raichand
 Ashwin Kaushal
 Apara Mehta as Mrs. Dilwale (Diya's mother)
 Mahesh Thakur as Mr. Raichand (Ranbeer's father)
Guddi Maruti as Guddi
Karan Thakur (actor) as Dr Manish
Rakesh Srivastava as Various Characters
 Krishna Bhatt
Khushboo Shroff
Umesh Bajpai Actor
Manju Brijnandan Sharma
Nirmal Soni
Prasad Barve
 Priyanshu Singh

References

External links
Official website

2016 Indian television series debuts
Indian television sitcoms
Sony SAB original programming
2016 Indian television series endings
Television series by Optimystix Entertainment